Travedona-Monate is a comune and small town near the eastern shore of the Lake Maggiore, in the province of Varese, northern Italy. The population is about 3,336 inhabitants. It shares boundaries with Biandronno, Brebbia, Bregano, Cadrezzate, Comabbio, Ispra, Malgesso, Osmate, Ternate, and the Lago di Monate lake.

References

See also
Festival del Rock at the Italian language Wikipedia.